Gobardhana is a village in West Champaran district in the Indian state of Bihar.

Demographics
As of 2011 India census, Gobardhana had a population of 1486 in 266 households. Males constitute 53.63% of the population and females 46.36%. Gobardhana has an average literacy rate of 42.79%, lower than the national average of 74%: male literacy is 63.83%, and female literacy is 36.16%. In Gobardhana, 20.72% of the population is under 6 years of age.

References

Villages in West Champaran district